The enzyme inulin fructotransferase (DFA-III-forming) catalyzes the following process:

Produces α-D-fructofuranose β-D-fructofuranose 1,2′:2,3′-dianhydride (DFA III) by successively eliminating the diminishing (2→1)-β-D-fructan (inulin) chain from the terminal D-fructosyl-D-fructosyl disaccharide.

Nomenclature 

This enzyme belongs to the family of lyases, specifically those carbon-oxygen lyases acting on polysaccharides.  The systematic name of this enzyme class is (2→1)-β-D-fructan lyase (α-D-fructofuranose-β-D-fructofuranose-1,2′:2,3′-dianhydride-forming). Other names in common use include inulin fructotransferase (DFA-III-producing), inulin fructotransferase (depolymerizing), inulase II, inulinase II, inulin fructotransferase (depolymerizing, difructofuranose-1,2′:2,3′-dianhydride-forming), inulin D-fructosyl-D-fructosyltransferase, (1,2′:2,3′-dianhydride-forming), inulin D-fructosyl-D-fructosyltransferase (forming, and α-D-fructofuranose β-D-fructofuranose 1,2′:2,3'-dianhydride).

References 

 
 

EC 4.2.2
Enzymes of known structure